Jennifer Rostock is a German rock band. They formed in 2007 out of Berlin and first rose to fame in 2008 for their performance in the German talent competition "The Bundesvision Song Contest"

History 
Jennifer Weist (born 3 December 1986) and Johannes "Joe" Walter-Müller are both natives of the German Baltic island Usedom, where they first met in kindergarten. Walter-Müller started to take music lessons as a five-year-old; he initially learned the violin, later he started to play the piano. At the age of 13, he met Weist again when she was singing at a karaoke show, and he invited her to join his school band. They experimented with different genres such as rock, pop, and swing. In the beginning they sang in English, later in German, and they eventually wrote their own songs. In 2004, both founded the band Aerials.

They met Werner Krumme, who later became their record producer, during a songwriting workshop in Rostock. After both finished high school (Gymnasium) in the summer of 2006, they moved to Berlin to pursue a career in music. There they also met their future band members Alex, Christoph, and Baku.

The band's name was originally based on a misunderstanding. Employees at the Planet Roc recording studios in Berlin repeatedly addressed notes for them to "Jennifer Rostock". Weist later explained: "Jennifer was directed at me, and Rostock, because they remembered we are from the coast, and Rostock was probably the only town the studio guys knew up there." This working title was eventually embraced by the band and became their official name.

In 2007, the group gave their first concerts as Jennifer Rostock and they signed a recording contract with Warner Music. They mainly performed in the Berlin club scene and played as opening acts for the British bands Chikinki and Gallows. In October, Jennifer Rostock released the EP Ich will hier raus as a vinyl record and they first receiving radio airplay by local stations in Berlin. In February 2008, their first single, "Kopf oder Zahl", was placed in rotation by MTV Germany. They competed with that song at the Bundesvision Song Contest, a German television show based on the Eurovision Song Contest, and came in fifth. Jennifer Rostock’s debut album, Ins offene Messer, was released the following day and reached number 31 in the German album charts.

They released two additional singles from their debut album, "Feuer" and "Himalaya". In June, Jennifer Rostock performed at MTV Campus Invasion in Jena, which was broadcast live by MTV, and they played at music festivals and concerts throughout Germany; they also had several shows in Austria and Switzerland. In October, they performed their song "Himalaya" at the tour premiere of German rock musician Udo Lindenberg in Rostock.

On 15 November 2017, the band announced via Facebook to go on hiatus after their planned tour for 2018. On 13 May 2018, they played their last show in the sold out Columbiahalle in Berlin.

Music 

Jennifer Rostock's line-up consists of lead vocalist Jennifer Weist, keyboardist Johannes "Joe" Walter-Müller, guitarist Alex, bassist Christoph, and drummer Baku. The group's unconventional German lyrics are collectively written by Weist and Walter-Müller who also compose and arrange the songs. Although difficult to categorise, Jennifer Rostock are sometimes compared to the Neue Deutsche Welle, especially due to their first single, "Kopf oder Zahl", and its similarities to the German 1980's band Ideal. The German newspaper die tageszeitung described their music as "between glam punk, electropop and Berlin-rock". They have also been described as mixing alternative rock with punk and electro.

Discography

Albums

Singles

EPs 
 2007: Ich Will Hier Raus
 2014: Kaleidoskop

References

External links 

  
 Official MySpace page
 Profile at Warner Music Germany 
 

2007 establishments in Germany
Musical groups established in 2007
German alternative rock groups
German punk rock groups
Electropop groups
Participants in the Bundesvision Song Contest
Musical groups from Berlin